Haemopidae is a family of leeches belonging to the order Arhynchobdellida.

Genera
The following may be included:
 Haemopis Savigny, 1820 
 Whitmania Blanchard, 1887 

Of other genera previously assigned to this family, Philobdella  and Semiscolex have since been assigned elsewhere, while Bdellarogatis, Mollibdella and Percymoorensis, created by Richardson (1969) for north American species formerly in Haemopis, are not generally accepted by current workers.

References

Annelid families
Leeches